HMS Spitfire was the French 6-gun privateer schooner Poulette, launched in 1793, that the Royal Navy captured that same year. Lieutenant John Perkins commissioned her in April. Under Perkins she was part of Commodore John Ford's squadron at Jamaica. She was lost with all hands off Saint-Domingue, Hispaniola, in February 1794.

French privateer
Poulette was a privateer from an unknown home port operating in the Caribbean in 1793.

HMS Spitfire
Spitfire was one of five vessels that shared in the proceeds of the capture on 17 July of the Lady Walterstasse, a Droit of Admiralty.

In September 1793 at the request of French Royalists Commodore Ford's squadron attacked Saint-Domingue and Jérémie in the Caribbean.

Lieutenant T.W. Rich replaced Perkins. On 12 February 1794 Spitfire capsized off Santo Domingo with the loss of her entire crew. Another account has her capsizing in the Mona Passage, off Santo Domingo, with the sloop Saucy Tom, Edmonson, master, rescuing four crew members after they had spent four hours in the water.

Citations and references
Citations

References
 Clowes, W. Laird, et al. (1897–1903) The royal navy: a history from the earliest times to the present. (Boston: Little, Brown and Co.; London: S. Low, Marston and Co.).
 
 
 
 

Schooners of the Royal Navy
Captured ships
Maritime incidents in 1794
1793 ships
Privateer ships of France
Warships lost with all hands